Mark Bomback (born August 29, 1971) is an American screenwriter, originally from New Rochelle, New York.  Bomback is a graduate of Wesleyan University, where he studied English Literature and Film Studies.

Biography
In 1994, Bomback began working as an assistant for Eagles guitarist Glenn Frey, holding the job for a year. His first credited screenplay was The Night Caller (1998). He has since gone on to co-write the scripts to numerous blockbuster films, including Live Free or Die Hard (2007), The Wolverine (2013) and Dawn of the Planet of the Apes (2014), and War for the Planet of the Apes (2017), as well as doing uncredited rewrites on several high-profile films, such as Fifty Shades of Grey (2015),  Logan and The Mummy (both 2017).

Bomback lives in Chappaqua, New York with his wife and four children. He is neighbors with former U.S. Secretary of State Hillary Clinton.

Filmography

Films 

Uncredited

Television

References

External links 
 
 Mark Bomback entry at Rotten Tomatoes
 The Night Caller at Movies.com
Interview with Mark Bomback at Scripts & Scribes

1971 births
Film producers from New York (state)
American male screenwriters
Living people
Mark Bomback
Writers from New Rochelle, New York
Screenwriters from New York (state)